is a Japanese professional shogi player, ranked 8-dan.

Early life
Sasaki was born in Geneva, Switzerland on August 5, 1994. His family moved to France when he was two years old and then returned to Misato in Saitama Prefecture, Japan when he was about five.

Shogi

Amateur shogi
As a young boy, Sasaki liked playing outdoors. His middle ear, however, became inflamed from swimming, and his doctor advised his parents to limit his playing to indoors for a while until it healed. Sasaki's father played the game go, but Sasaki started studying shogi at the prodding of his mother because she was worried that her son might mistakenly swallow one of the go pieces.

As a first-grade elementary school student, he was already playing against adults at his local shogi club and was soon going to the club six days a week. In 2003, Sasaki won the lower-grade section of the 2nd  as a third-grade student, and then the following year he won the 29th  as a fourth-grade student to become just the second fourth grader, after Akira Watanabe, to win the tournament.

In September 2004, Sasaki was accepted into the Japan Shogi Association's apprentice school at the rank of 6-kyū under the guidance of shogi professional . In April 2008, Sasaki was promoted to the rank of appentice-professional 3-dan as a second-year junior high school student, which at the time tied the record for being the second fastest person to do so since entering the apprentice school. He obtained full professional status and the rank of 4-dan in October 2010 after winning the 47th 3-dan League (April 2010September 2010) with a record of 14 wins and 4 losses. Sasaki was 16 years and 1 month old and still a junior high school student when he was awarded professional status, thus becoming just the  sixth junior high school student to turn professional.

Shogi professional
Sasaki ended Sōta Fujii's record of 29 consecutive wins by defeating Fujii on his 30th game.

Promotion history
Sasaki's promotion history is as follows:
 6-kyū: 2004
 3-dan: 2008
 4-dan: October 1, 2010
 5-dan: March 11, 2014
 6-dan: July 11, 2017
 7-dan: November 16, 2018
 8-dan: March 9, 2023

Titles and other championships
Sasaki has yet to appear in a major title, and his only tournament victory as a professional came in October 2013 when he defeated Shōta Chida 2 games to 1 to win the 3rd .

Awards and honors 
Sasaki won the Japan Shogi Association's Annual Shogi Awards for "Most Games Played" (65 games) in 2017, and the Kōzō Masuda Award for the Yūki Side Pawn Capture in 2018.

References

External links
ShogiHub: Professional Player Info · Sasaki, Yuki

Japanese shogi players
Living people
Professional shogi players
Professional shogi players from Saitama Prefecture
Professional shogi players born outside of Japan
1994 births